Noël Mamère (born 25 December 1948 in Libourne, Gironde) is a French journalist and politician. He was the mayor of Bègles in Gironde as well as deputy to the French National Assembly for that constituency. He was for several years a member of the party Europe Écologie–The Greens, but left it in late September 2013.

Biography
Noël Mamère rose to fame in the 1980s as a journalist and anchorman, in particular on Antenne 2.

In 1992, he became president of Brice Lalonde's Ecology Generation party, from which he was expelled in 1994. He then founded "Ecology-Solidarity Convergences", of which he was president, before joining Les Verts in 1998.

In 2002, he was presidential candidate and garnered 5.25% of the votes.

On 5 June 2004, he stirred up controversy by conducting a marriage ceremony for a male homosexual couple, nine years before same-sex marriage became legal in France.

Political career

Electoral mandates

European Parliament

Member of European Parliament : 1994–1997 (Resignation, elected in the National Assembly of France). Elected in 1994.

National Assembly of France

Member of the National Assembly of France for Gironde : 1997–2017. Elected in 1997, reelected in 2002, 2007, 2012.

Regional Council

Regional councillor of Aquitaine : 1992-1994 (Resignation) / March 1998 (Resignation). Reelected in 1998.

Municipal Council

Mayor of Bègles : 1989–2017. Reelected in 1995, 2001, 2008, 2014.

Municipal councillor of Bègles : 1989–2017. Reelected in 1995, 2001, 2008, 2014.

Urban community Council

Vice-president of the Urban Community of Bordeaux : 1989–2001. Reelected in 1995.

Member of the Urban Community of Bordeaux : 1989–2001. Reelected in 1995.

External links
 Official website

1948 births
Living people
People from Libourne
Candidates in the 2002 French presidential election
MEPs for France 1994–1999
Ecology Generation politicians
Europe Ecology – The Greens politicians
20th-century French lawyers
French television journalists
French LGBT rights activists
Mayors of places in Nouvelle-Aquitaine
People from Bègles
Deputies of the 12th National Assembly of the French Fifth Republic
Deputies of the 13th National Assembly of the French Fifth Republic
Deputies of the 14th National Assembly of the French Fifth Republic